Kounoupitsa is a village and a community in the northern end of the Methana peninsula, northeastern Peloponnese, Greece. It is part of the municipality Troizinia-Methana. The community consists of the villages Kounoupitsa, Agios Georgios, Agios Nikolaos, Makrylongos and Palaia Loutra. The population of the community at the 2011 census was 178, of which 75 in the village Kounoupitsa. Agios Nikolaos is known for its volcanic hot springs.

Historical population

See also
List of settlements in Attica

References

External links
Agios Nikolaos
GTP Travel Pages

Troizinia-Methana
Populated places in Islands (regional unit)